Yefremov is a military air base in Tula Oblast, Russia.  It is located 9 km east of the town of the same name. It largely served the interceptor air defense role for the Soviet Air Force.  The host unit was the 191 IAP (191st Fighter Aviation Regiment).

The regiment first used the Mikoyan-Gurevich MiG-15 (NATO: Fagot) between 1950 and 1955, then used the Mikoyan-Gurevich MiG-17F (NATO: Fresco) between 1955 and 1961. It then operated the Sukhoi Su-9 (NATO: Fishpot) between 1961 and 1965.  The regiment replaced it in 1965 with the Sukhoi Su-11 (NATO: Fishpot-C) then moved to the Mikoyan-Gurevich MiG-23P (NATO: Flogger-G).

239th Independent Guards Helicopter Regiment between 1994 and 1998 with the Mil Mi-24 (NATO: Hind).

The base was reportedly closed in 1998 and the aviation regiment was disbanded.

References

Russian Air Force bases
Soviet Air Force bases
Soviet Air Defence Force bases